Henri Françillon (born 26 May 1946) was a Haitian international footballer who was part of the Haitian squad at the World Cup in Germany in 1974 where he played in all three group matches. He played as a goalkeeper. He played for the Haitian Victory SC and German TSV 1860 Munich. In 1976, he played in the National Soccer League with Ottawa Tigers.

References

External links
 

1946 births
Living people
Sportspeople from Port-au-Prince
Haitian footballers
Haitian expatriate footballers
Haiti international footballers
Haitian expatriate sportspeople in Germany
Victory SC players
Association football goalkeepers
CONCACAF Championship-winning players
1974 FIFA World Cup players
Ligue Haïtienne players
2. Bundesliga players
TSV 1860 Munich players
Expatriate footballers in Germany
Canadian National Soccer League players
Haitian expatriate sportspeople in Canada
Expatriate soccer players in Canada